The Iberdrola Open was a European Tour golf tournament which was played in 2010 and 2011 at Pula Golf Club, Son Servera on the island of Mallorca in Spain. The tournament was cancelled in 2012 due to lack of sponsorship.

The venue had previously been the host of the Mallorca Classic, a former tournament on the European Tour. The prize fund in the first year was € 800,000 (about US$1.01 million).

Winners

References

External links
Official website
Coverage on European Tour's official site

Former European Tour events
Golf tournaments in Spain